William J. Bernd House may refer to:

William J. Bernd House (Arch Avenue, New Richmond, Wisconsin), listed on the National Register of Historic Places in St. Croix County, Wisconsin
William J. Bernd House (Second Street, New Richmond, Wisconsin), listed on the National Register of Historic Places in St. Croix County, Wisconsin